The Universal Cheerleaders Association Division I-A College Championships were first introduced in 1978 on CBS Sports. Top cheerleading teams from colleges across the U.S. and foreign countries perform routines consisting of gymnastics, partner stunts, dance moves, pyramids and high-tosses called basket tosses. The championship is split into large co-ed, small coed and all-girl divisions, with large co-ed being the most prestigious of the three. The University of Kentucky has won the most co-ed championships with 25 national titles. The University of South Florida won the most recent co-ed event in 2023, making it three championships in a row for the Bulls. The 2023 all-girl competition was won by Western Kentucky University, their second title in three years. Only four teams have ever won consecutive championships in UCA Division I-A history. The University of Kentucky have done it 5 times over the course of their history, spanning from the first time from 1987 to 1988 and most recently between 2016 and 2019. The other cheerleading squads to have accomplish this feat are the University of South Florida (2021-2023), NC State (1990-1991) and The Ohio State University (1981-1983). The competition is run by Varsity Spirit.

Co-ed Champions by Year

 2023 - University of South Florida
 2022 - University of South Florida
 2021 - University of South Florida
 2020 - University of Central Florida
 2019 - University of Kentucky
 2018 - University of Kentucky
 2017 - University of Kentucky
 2016 - University of Kentucky
 2015 - University of Alabama
 2014 - University of Kentucky
 2013 - University of Memphis
 2012 - University of Kentucky
 2011 - University of Alabama
 2010 - University of Kentucky
 2009 - University of Kentucky
 2008 - University of Kentucky
 2007 - University of Central Florida
 2006 - University of Kentucky
 2005 - University of Kentucky
 2004 - University of Kentucky
 2003 - University of Central Florida
 2002 - University of Kentucky
 2001 - University of Kentucky
 2000 - University of Kentucky/University of North Texas (co-champions)
 1999 - University of Kentucky
 1998 - University of Kentucky
 1997 - University of Kentucky
 1996 - University of Kentucky
 1995 - University of Kentucky
 1994 - University of North Carolina
 1993 - Ohio State University
 1992 - University of Kentucky
 1991 - NC State University
 1990 - NC State University
 1989 - Louisiana State University
 1988 - University of Kentucky
 1987 - University of Kentucky
 1986 - North Carolina State University
 1985 - University of Kentucky
 1984 - University of Alabama
 1983 - Ohio State University
 1982 - Ohio State University
 1981 - Ohio State University
 1980 - Indiana State University
 1979 - Michigan State University
 1978 - University of North Carolina

All-girl Champions by Year 
 2023 - Western Kentucky University
 2022 - University of Alabama
 2021 - Western Kentucky University
 2020 - University of Alabama
 2019 - Indiana University
 2018 - University of Oklahoma
 2017 - Indiana University
 2016 - Indiana University
 2015 - University of Oklahoma 
 2014 - Indiana University 
 2013 - Indiana University
 2012 - Indiana University
 2011 - 
 2010 -
 2009 - San Diego State University
 2008 - University of Memphis

Small Coed Champions by Year 

 2023 - Florida State University
 2022 - Western Kentucky University
 2021 - University of Memphis
 2020 - University of Memphis
 2019 - University of Memphis
 2018 - Purdue University
 2017 - University of Memphis
 2016 - Hofstra University
 2015 - Hofstra University
 2014 - Bowling Green State University
 2013 - Hofstra University
 2012 - Hofstra University
 2011 - Hofstra University
 2010 - Hofstra University
 2009 - Hofstra University
 2008 - University of Louisiana- Monroe
 2007 - Hofstra University
 2006 - Hofstra University
 2005 - 
 2004 -
 2003 - Hofstra University

References



Cheerleading competitions